Hamburg Central School District is a New York State public school district that serves the village of Hamburg of Erie County. It operates one high school, one middle school, and four elementary schools.

Administration 

The District offices are located at 5305 Abbott Road in Hamburg. The current Superintendent is Michael Cornell.

Selected Former Superintendents 
Previous assignment and reason for departure denoted in parentheses
Glenn C. Harris
Ford R. Park
Frederick Moffit
Harry H. Hatten–1957-1971
Lewis A. Grell
Donald J. Ogilvie–1989-1997 (Superintendent - Southwestern Central School District, named Superintendent of Erie 1 BOCES)
Peter G. Roswell–1997-2007 (Superintendent - Holland Central School District, retired)
Gordon Kerr [interim]–2007 (Assistant Superintendent - Hamburg Central School District, returned to position)
Mark J. Crawford–2007-2010 (Superintendent - Dryden Central School District, named Superintendent of West Seneca Central School District)
Steven A. Achramovitch–2010-2013 (Superintendent - Greece Central School District, retired)
Richard Jetter–2013-2014 (Assistant Superintendent for Technology - Hamburg Central School District, resigned)

Hamburg High School 

Hamburg High School is located at 4111 Legion Road and serves grades 9-12. The current principal is Michael Gallagher.

History 
Hamburg High School opened on November 12, 1925 in what is now the Union Pleasant Elementary School building. It moved to the newly-constructed Legion Drive location beginning with the 1955-1956 school year where it remains today.

A 1997 addition created a new wing on the south side of the building that houses Business and Mathematics classrooms as well as two teacher workrooms. In 2018, the Library Media Center was redesigned and renovated.

Hamburg Middle School 

Hamburg Middle School is located at 360 Division Street and serves grades 6 through 8. The current principal is Thomas Adams.

History 
Hamburg Middle School was built in 1963 and opened in 1964. It served as a Junior High School (grades 7 - 9) until the end of the 1996-97 school year.

Armor Elementary School 

Armor Elementary School is located at 5301 Abbott Road and serves grades K through 5. The current principal is Leslie Bennett.

History 
Armor Elementary was built in 1969 and opened in 1970 as a single-floor brick building. It was renovated in 1997 to include eight additional classrooms, a new main office, and improved special classrooms.

Boston Valley Elementary School 

Boston Valley Elementary School is located at 7476 Back Creek Road and serves Grades K through 5. The current principal is Nicole Lauer.

History 
Boston Valley Elementary was built in 1958 and opened in 1959.

Charlotte Avenue Elementary School 

Charlotte Avenue School is located at 301 Charlotte Avenue and serves grades K through 5. The current principal is Danielle Lango.

History 
Charlotte Avenue Elementary was built in 1952 and opened in 1953.

Union Pleasant Elementary School 

Union Pleasant School is located at 150 Pleasant Avenue and serves grades K through 5. The current principal is Jacqueline Peffer.

History 
Union Pleasant Elementary opened on November 12, 1925 as the original Hamburg High School. The new Hamburg High School opened in the 1955-1956 school year, and Union Pleasant Elementary School took the place of the original high school.

References

External links
 Hamburg Central School District

Education in Erie County, New York
School districts in New York (state)